Henry Moore Ridgely (August 6, 1779 – August 6, 1847) was an American lawyer and politician from Dover, in Kent County, Delaware. He was a member of the Federalist Party, and later the Democratic Party, who served as U.S. Representative from Delaware and as U.S. Senator from Delaware.

Early life and family
Ridgely was born in Dover, Delaware, the son of Dr. Charles and Ann Moore Ridgely. He attended Dickinson College and studied law with Charles Smith of Lancaster, Pennsylvania. Admitted to the Delaware Bar in 1802, he began a practice in Dover. Sally Banning of Dover was his first wife, and they had 15 children, including eight who lived to adulthood: Charles George, Elizabeth, Ann (who married Charles Irénée du Pont), Henry, Nicholas, Eugene, Williamina and Edward. In 1842, Ridgely married Sarah Ann Comegys, the daughter of Cornelius P. Comegys, the former Governor of Delaware. They had no children. They were all members of Christ Episcopal Church. Ridgely was instrumental in the organization of the Farmer's Bank and served as its president in Dover for 40 years.

Professional and political career
Ridgely was a Federalist and began his political career in the State House, serving in three sessions from 1808 through 1810. He was a Kent County Levy Court Commissioner as well. Subsequently, he was elected to the 12th and 13th United States House from required until March 4, 1811 until March 3, 1815. There he joined the general Federalist opposition to the War of 1812. Much of his correspondence from these days is published in A Calendar of Ridgely Family Letters, 1742–1899.

Not seeking reelection in 1814, he returned to Dover and resumed the practice of law. He served as the Secretary of State of Delaware from 1817 until 1827 and also was elected to the State House for the 1816, 1822, and 1827 sessions. In 1827, he was elected to the United States Senate to fill the vacancy caused by the death of Nicholas Van Dyke and served out his term from January 12, 1827 until March 3, 1829. He was not reelected to the next Congress because, in the great political realignment then underway, Ridgely had become a supporter of President Andrew Jackson, in opposition to the majority in the Delaware General Assembly. He was an opponent of slavery and is said to have bought slaves, only to release them.

Death and legacy
Ridgely died at Dover on August 6, 1847, his 68th birthday, and is buried there in the Christ Episcopal Church Cemetery. He was considered a man of superior judgment with a considerable talent for business.

Almanac
Elections were held the first Tuesday of October. Members of the State House took office on the first Tuesday of January for a one-year term. U.S. Representatives took office March 4 and have a two-year term. The General Assembly chose the U.S. Senators, who also took office March 4, but for a six-year term.

References

External links
Biographical Dictionary of the United States Congress
Delaware’s Members of Congress

The Political Graveyard

1779 births
1847 deaths
People from Dover, Delaware
American people of English descent
American Episcopalians
Delaware Jacksonians
Federalist Party members of the United States House of Representatives from Delaware
Jacksonian United States senators from Delaware
Secretaries of State of Delaware
Delaware lawyers
Dickinson College alumni
Burials in Dover, Delaware
Ridgely family